Cardiacs are an English rock band formed in Kingston upon Thames by Tim Smith (lead guitar and vocals) and his brother Jim (bass, backing vocals) in 1977 under the name Cardiac Arrest. The band's sound fused circus, baroque pop and medieval music with progressive rock and post-punk, adding other elements like nursery rhymes and sea shanties. Tim Smith was the primary lyricist, noted for his complex and innovative compositional style. He and his brother were the only constant members in the band's regularly changing lineup.

The band created their own indie label, the Alphabet Business Concern, in 1984 and found mainstream exposure with the single "Is This the Life?" from their debut album A Little Man and a House and the Whole World Window (1988). Their second album, On Land and in the Sea (1989), was followed by Heaven Born and Ever Bright (1992), which displayed a harder edged, metal-leaning sound retained in the subsequent albums Sing to God (1996) and Guns (1999). The final Cardiacs album, LSD, was left unfinished after Smith was hospitalised with dystonia resulting from a cardiac arrest and stroke in 2008, which caused the band to go on hiatus indefinitely.

One of Britain's leading cult rock bands, Cardiacs' sound folded in genres including art rock, jazz, psychedelia and metal, topped by Smith's anarchic vocals and hard-to-decipher lyrics. The band's theatrical performance style often incorporated off-putting costumes and makeup with on-stage confrontations. Their bizarre sound and image made them unpopular with the press, but they amassed a devoted following. Smith's illness brought increased critical recognition to Cardiacs, with several music outlets calling Sing to God a masterpiece. His death in 2020 saw a raft of tributes on social media. Many rock groups including Blur and Radiohead were influenced by Cardiacs' eclectic music, which appeared on streaming services in 2021.

History

1977–1984: Early years 

Cardiacs originated in Kingston upon Thames, Surrey, in the late 1970s. Frontman Tim Smith began his musical career in 1975 after forming a nameless band at school in which he played guitar. Smith played his first gig at Surbiton Assembly Rooms aged 16 alongside Adrian Borland of the Outsiders and drummer Bruce Bisland as Gazunder. The Cardiacs biography describes their two gigs in 1976 as sounding "a bit like the rocky instrumental bits" on David Bowie's The Man Who Sold the World (1970). The band that would become Cardiacs was formed in late 1977 by Smith and his brother Jim on bass guitar and backing vocals, alongside Michael Pugh on lead vocals and Peter Tagg on drums. The project was initially called the Filth, but soon changed their name to Cardiac Arrest. According to the official history, Tim Smith formed the band merely to punish his brother "for all the unkind things he would do to him as an infant", as Jim allegedly couldn't play an instrument.

Cardiac Arrest produced a demo in 1977, and released their debut single "A Bus for a Bus on the Bus" in 1979 under Tortch Records. Smith, the primary lyricist, initially took on guitar and backing vocal duties before a personnel change saw him promoted to frontman. Cardiac Arrest followed the single with a full-length cassette release titled The Obvious Identity in 1980, which was released at around 1000 copies exclusively sold at concerts. Shortly after, the group went through a number of name changes, settling on simply Cardiacs in 1981. They held their first concert under the new name in April.

In 1981, Cardiacs self-released the cassette album, Toy World, featuring both new material and recordings dating back to the Cardiac Arrest period. (Consequently, some tracks featured Michael Pugh as lead singer rather than Tim Smith). During 1981, Colvin Mayers left the band to join the Sound, a group led by Borland. Sarah Cutts briefly covered live keyboards as well as saxophone, before Mark Cawthra swapped drums for keyboards and Dominic Luckman was recruited from the road crew as the new drummer. At around the same time percussionist Tim Quy became a full-time member (also doubling on bass synthesizer). In July 1983, Tim Smith married Sarah Cutts – taking his surname, she was henceforward known as Sarah Smith.

In mid-1983 Mark Cawthra left the band, to be replaced on keyboards by William D. Drake. Tim Smith had previously met Drake in 1982 at the debut performance of Drake's band Honour Our Trumpet (who promptly invited him to join as bass guitarist.) Following Cawthra's departure, Smith returned Drake's favour by inviting him to join Cardiacs. Drake played his first concert with the band on 31 August 1983. Later in the year, Cardiacs added Marguerite Johnston (alto saxophone) and Graham Simmonds (guitar), and for about a year the band worked as an octet. Both Johnston and Simmonds left during the following summer (in July and August respectively), although Simmonds stayed on as Cardiacs' sound engineer. At some point in 1983, Tim Smith produced two issues of a comic alternatively called "Peter and His Dog" and "Peter and His Dog Spot".

1984–1989: The "classic lineup" established

The Seaside and Seaside Treats 

By autumn 1984, the band lineup had settled as the sextet generally referred to as "the classic lineup" – Tim Smith (lead vocals and guitar), Jim Smith (bass and vocals), William D. Drake (keyboards and vocals), Sarah Smith (saxophones and vocals), Tim Quy (percussion and keyboards) and Dominic Luckman (drums). The first Cardiacs release featuring the "classic" lineup was their third album, The Seaside (although Cawthra featured throughout on drums, keyboards and voice; and Simmonds and Johnston also appeared on several tracks). The album was released on Cardiacs own record label, Alphabet (which later became Alphabet Business Concern). The bizarre and sinister "Alphabet Business Concern" mythology now began to become a significant part of Cardiacs' artistic presentation, and the band members would promote and add to it at every opportunity. The band evolved an elaborate and theatrical stage show, involving off-putting "bandsmen's uniforms, makeup, Sarah's music stand, (and) Tim's mile-wide grin".

Between 5 November – 21 December 1984, Cardiacs performed their first major British support tour, supporting Marillion at the personal invitation of Marillion's vocalist, Fish. Whilst the tour afforded the band a new level of publicity, generally they were not well received by Marillion's fanbase. On most dates of the tour, the band was pelted with a variety of makeshift missiles. During the 13 December show at the Hammersmith Apollo, Fish himself was indignant enough about the Marillion fans and their hostile behaviour to come onstage during Cardiacs' set and berate the audience about it. The band eventually ducked out of the last three days of the Marillion tour.

A Cardiacs spin-off project – Mr and Mrs Smith and Mr Drake – emerged in 1984. As the name suggests, this featured Tim and Sarah Smith plus William D. Drake and consisted of a quieter, more acoustically-orientated take on Cardiacs' music. The project released a self-titled cassette album which was only available via the Cardiacs fan club. Later on, the project would be renamed the Sea Nymphs.

On 1 April 1985, an attempt was made to film Cardiacs at a live concert at the Surbiton Assembly Rooms. The band had been approached by film-maker Mark Francombe (later a member of Cranes) and his colleague Nick Elborough, both of whom were at that time students at Portsmouth College of Art and Design. Francombe and Elborough offered to film the band for free as part of their coursework project. However, when the band viewed the resultant footage, they decided against releasing it. Instead, they retained Francombe and Elborough for a new video project which would become Seaside Treats, named after the 12" single that was released at the same time. As well as containing three music videos, Seaside Treats  contained a ten-minute film named The Consultant's Flower Garden. The latter featured Cardiacs (and various people connected with them) in bizarre, comedic situations which continued to propagate the absurdist Alphabet Business Concern mythology which surrounded the band.

Big Ship, A Little Man and a House & On Land and in the Sea 

Cardiacs played the Reading Festival on 24 August 1986, releasing the very rough audio footage as the Rude Bootleg album. On 27 January 1987, Cardiacs released the mini-album Big Ship, the first studio release by the sextet, to mixed reviews. The title track would prove to be one of their most enduring anthems.

In March 1987, the British tabloid newspaper Sunday Sport ran a story claiming to be an exposé and revealing the supposedly incestuous relationship between Tim Smith and Sarah Smith, in which the couple were portrayed as brother and sister. The headline ran, "In their bizarre world of music... anything goes – even incest." (The article ultimately debunked the story by including a corrective quote from Tim Smith's mother). Band manager Mark Walmesley is thought to have started the whole rumour to gain some publicity for the band, predating the superficially similar strategy later employed by the White Stripes twelve years later.

On 17 April, the band's music video for "Tarred and Feathered" (from the Big Ship mini-album) was broadcast on Channel 4's groundbreaking music show The Tube, giving Cardiacs their first exposure on national television. Later in the year, Cardiacs released a 12-inch single called "There's Too Many Irons in the Fire". In October, a live-in-the-studio session was recorded and broadcast by BBC Radio Leeds, followed in December by a similar session on BBC Radio 1 for Janice Long's Night Track show.

In 1988, Cardiacs released their debut studio album proper, A Little Man and a House and the Whole World Window. The single from the album, "Is This the Life?", saw brief chart success due to exposure on mainstream radio, and garnered the attention of a wider audience when it entered the Independent Top 10 in the UK. The band followed up this burst of success with another single, a cover of the Kinks' "Susannah's Still Alive" with a video directed by Steve Payne. Strange Fruit Records also released a 12-inch vinyl EP of the band's BBC Radio 1 session from the previous year, under the title Night Tracks (The Janice Long Session). By this time, Cardiacs concerts were drawing hundreds of audience members and they were well on their way to becoming a hit underground band. On 15 May, the band played a concert at the Paradiso in Amsterdam, which was recorded for later release as Cardiacs Live.

Later in the year, Cardiacs recorded tracks for what would become their fifth studio album, On Land and in the Sea which was released in 1989. The album successfully consolidated the intricate style and unusual songwriting vision of A Little Man and a House..., but the stable lineup which the band had enjoyed for four years was now beginning to weaken.

1989–1999: Classic lineup fractures and power quartet established

All That Glitters Is a Mares Nest and multiple departures 

Over the following two years, the Cardiacs lineup began to disintegrate. Sarah Smith left the band suddenly in April 1989 and was not replaced, removing saxophone from the standard Cardiacs sound. Although Sarah would not rejoin the band, she would retain a long-term connection with Cardiacs by playing on future albums and would very occasionally appear as a special guest for live concerts. Tim Smith brought in a second guitarist – Christian 'Bic' Hayes, formerly of Ring and the Dave Howard Singers – and the new two-guitar lineup toured extensively around the UK and Europe for the rest of the year (with Sarah Smith making the first of her special guest appearances at a Brixton Fridge concert on 17 September). During this period, the band also released Archive Cardiacs, a collection of material from the 1976–83 period (some of it previously unreleased).

Cardiacs toured and gigged intermittently during 1990, culminating in a shared concert with Napalm Death at Salisbury Arts Centre on 30 June. The Cardiacs half of the concert was filmed and released as the video Maresnest (produced by Steve Mallet and directed by Steve Payne, and eventually also released as the 1995 live album All that Glitters is a Mares Nest). The band performed as a seven-piece, with Sarah Smith making a one-day return as a band member. Although the concert has achieved legendary status amongst Cardiacs fans, it was problematic for the band. Among other things, Tim Smith's guitar fell apart and keys fell off Sarah Smith's saxophone.

After the Salisbury concert, Tim Quy left the band to pursue other projects. Like Sarah Smith, he was not replaced: the removal of live tuned and untuned percussion from the lineup further altered the established Cardiacs sound. Quy's departure was commemorated by a message at the end of the Maresnest video stating "this film is dedicated to Tim Quy who left our world 30/8/90". (At the time, this was widely misinterpreted as an announcement of Quy's death).

The band was quiet for the first four months of 1991, during which time two more members departed. William D. Drake played his final concert with the band on 2 May at The Venue in New Cross (going on to join the band Nervous and, in 2001, embarking on a long-delayed solo career). Christian Hayes (had joined up-and-coming indie-psychedelic band Levitation) played his own final gig as a Cardiac in Oxford on 16 May: although Cardiacs and Levitation were friendly with each other and had even toured together, Hayes had finally found it impossible to balance the demands of both bands. Both Hayes and Drake would continue to be associated with Cardiacs, and would occasionally guest with the band at selected live concerts many years later.

Heaven Born and Ever Bright and the Rough Trade debacle 

Although the band had historically been well-used to lineup changes, Cardiacs were profoundly affected by the multiple departures taking place between 1989 and 1991. A particular blow had been the departure of Drake, whose virtuoso keyboard skills and compositional input had made him one of the backbones of the band. Drake was considered irreplaceable and Cardiacs opted not to look for a new keyboard player, remaining as a quartet of two guitars, bass and drums (with Christian Hayes being replaced as second guitarist by Jon Poole who had previously played with the Cardiacs-inspired Milton Keynes band Ad Nauseam). While Cardiacs was still able to record more fully orchestrated music in the studio, a lack of suitable personnel (or the budget to keep them in place) meant that the live band had to change drastically. Abandoning several signature musical features (saxophone, assorted percussion and virtuoso keyboards), Cardiacs' live music shifted away from the wider instrumentation of the past and moved towards a more guitar-heavy, power-rock sound in line with the remaining quartet lineup. However, the music remained complex, if narrower in focus, and Smith recorded additional keyboard and percussion parts onto backing tapes for the band to play over.

Before 1991 was over, the revitalised band had released a new single, called "Day Is Gone", and played several concerts from October to December. This year also saw the release of Songs for Ships and Irons, which compiled material from the Big Ship mini-album plus various singles and EPs. Also making an appearance in 1991 was the debut release by the Cardiacs spin-off, the Sea Nymphs. Their debut single, "Appealing to Venus", was a free bonus item with the first 500 copies of "Day Is Gone" and was subsequently sold through the fan club. The debut Sea Nymphs album, The Sea Nymphs, was released in 1992. Cardiacs remained active during 1992, touring frequently within the UK, including a double-headed tour with Levitation. On 4 June 1992 at the London Astoria, Cardiacs were supported by Radiohead, who have acknowledged their influence from the band.

Prior to the departure of Hayes, Cardiacs had recorded an album called Heaven Born and Ever Bright (which featured several of Hayes' guitar and vocal parts, plus a track he had co-written called "Goodbye Grace"). This was released as the new Cardiacs album in the summer of 1992, the first fruit of a new distribution deal with Rough Trade Records. However, Rough Trade ceased trading shortly after the release of the album. This ensured that Heaven Born and Ever Bright could neither be stocked nor ordered by record shops, with the result that Cardiacs were left thousands of pounds in debt and unable to recoup their recording expenses. (The album was eventually reissued on a revived Alphabet Business Concern in 1995 – it featured a picture of Jon Poole on the cover, although he had not actually played on the album when it was recorded.)

Despite this crippling blow, the band soldiered on, but by July 1993 yet another long-term member – drummer Dominic Luckman – had decided to quit. He played his last concert as a Cardiac member on 20 July at Camden Palace, London (and would later join the Shrubbies). In December 1993, Cardiacs revealed their new drummer, Jon Poole's former Ad Nauseam bandmate, Bob Leith. However, the following year proved to be Cardiacs' quietest year for a long time, with only four concerts played in total.

Sing to God & Guns 
After three years without any new releases, 1995 saw the release of the Bellyeye single on Org Records (the record-releasing wing of long-term Cardiacs' supporters Organ Magazine). This was a taster for Cardiacs' most epic recorded effort to date. Sing to God was a double album, due to the sheer amount of material that Smith had written over a number of years. The album was notable for a change in Cardiacs' working methods – whereas most previous material had been written and arranged by Smith, the Sing to God sessions saw extensive contributions from Jon Poole who played a strong role in orchestrating Smith's basic material with detailed riffs and keyboard parts (and contributed several songs entirely written by himself). Drummer Bob Leith also made significant contributions to the album's lyrics.

Sing to God was released in two formats – as a limited edition double CD, and as two separate CDs. At the same time, the band reissued almost their entire back catalogue on CD. This constituted all of the albums from The Seaside onwards, CD issues of live album All that Glitters is a Mares Nest and the Archive Cardiacs compilation, and a new compilation, the Cardiacs Sampler.

In April 1995, Cardiacs performed a BBC Manchester radio session on Mark Radcliffe's show. During May, they toured with Pura Vida and Sidi Bou Said and recorded a live acoustic session for GLR Radio. On 17 June, they appeared as special guests of (and concert openers for) Blur at their triumphant London Mile End Stadium concert. From 31 October to 18 November, Cardiacs performed a long support stint on Chumbawamba's UK tour.

In June and November 1996, Cardiacs embarked on two UK tours of their own, most significantly filling the Astoria 2 on 2 November. The June tour was promoted by a second BBC Manchester radio session with Mark Radcliffe, aired on 11 June.

The next two years saw no new music from Cardiacs and reduced live activity. However, there were three more London concerts in 1998 – at one of these (the Garage concert on 4 December) the band was joined for an encore by William D. Drake. During the same year Cardiacs also played several performances in Germany and the Netherlands, and made appearances in Brighton and at a festival in St Austell in Cornwall. 1998 also saw renewed activity by the Sea Nymphs, with the "Appealing To Venus" single reissued with extra tracks by Org Records, and a rare concert at the Camden Falcon in north London.

At the start of 1999, Cardiacs played three nights in a row at the Camden Falcon, London between 29 and 31 January: on the final date, Sarah Smith and William D. Drake joined in for the encore. On 20 and 21 March the band played two concerts at the Garage with support from Dark Star (a new band featuring ex-Cardiac Christian Hayes) and Camp Blackfoot. Cardiacs toured the UK in June 1999 to support the release of their new album, Guns, described by some of the music press as being their most accessible album to date. The band performed another radio session on 13 June for "Inside Tracks" (on BBC Choice digital radio). Three more concerts followed in October.

2000–2008: lineup changes and reestablishment

Rare sightings, family gatherings and aborted recordings 
During 1999–2000, Cardiacs began work on a new studio album that remains incomplete and unreleased. Only one song slated for inclusion ("Faster Than Snakes With a Ball and a Chain") has ever been released to the public (it appears on the band's 2002 compilation Greatest Hits). Another song, the Jon Poole-penned "Silvery", appeared regularly in the band's live repertoire, and was later re-recorded by Jon Poole himself for the God Damn Whores' second album (albeit under the title "Sparkly Silver Sky"). While Tim Smith's given explanation for the album's nonappearance was that it had been rendered "broken" in some manner, bandmate Kavus Torabi has since stated that, while the band did record around this time, the concept of a "lost album" was apocryphal. Cardiacs concerts were rare over the next few years, although the band played the Glastonbury Festival on 23 June 2000 and played two subsequent Whitchurch Festivals on 5 August 2000 and 3 August 2001.

Counterbalancing the lack of tours, the band set up an annual tradition of one-off large-scale London concerts (the first of which took place on 11 November 2000 and the last in 2007). These usually took place in November at the London Astoria, and soon became a kind of Cardiacs family gathering in which the band was joined by various guests including former members and newer Cardiacs-inspired supported bands. During these concerts, Sarah Smith, William D. Drake, Christian Hayes and Dominic Luckman all appeared onstage with the band on various occasions, as did the Consultant and Miss Swift. Support bands were always musicians with a professed Cardiacs connection or influence, and included Oceansize, the Monsoon Bassoon, the Scaramanga Six, Stars in Battledress and Jon Poole's hard-rock band GodDamnWhores.

The Special Garage Concerts 
Between 17–19 October 2003, Cardiacs recorded three special concerts at the Highbury Garage venue in London. As Jon Poole was by now also the bass player for the Wildhearts (and busy rehearsing for the upcoming Wildhearts tour) he was replaced for the concert by Kavus Torabi (formerly guitarist and singer for the Monsoon Bassoon, Torabi was also a long-standing Cardiacs' associate who'd served as their guitar technician since the mid-1990s.)

For these concerts, the band delved back into their distant past, abandoning virtually all of their available back catalogue in favour of exclusively playing songs that had been performed prior to 1983. These were taken mostly from the cassette albums (The Obvious Identity and Toy World, but also included songs such as An Ant, Hopeless, Gloomy News and Hello Mr Minnow (which had never been officially recorded before and had only ever been played at concerts in the late '70s/early '80s). A two-volume CD set of recordings from the three shows – The Special Garage Concerts – was eventually released in 2005. Professional video camera equipment was apparently seen being used to record the band during the concerts, leading to a rumour that members of Org Records had filmed the entire three nights for later video release. This was debunked by Torabi in a 2009 interview, in which he stated that no such recordings existed.

In the autumn of 2004, Torabi officially replaced Poole as Cardiacs' second guitarist, and made his formal debut as a full group member at the annual London Astoria concert on 12 November (Poole would go on to concentrate on GodDamnWhores, various Wildhearts-related projects, Crayola Lectern and others). A number of other new members were drafted into the Cardiacs lineup at the same time –  three backing singers (Claire Lemmon and Melanie Woods of Sidi Bou Said, plus former Shrubbies and current North Sea Radio Orchestra singer Sharron Fortnam) and two percussionists – Cathy Harabaras and Dawn Staple – playing mostly bass drums.

After several years of limited live activity in front of established fans, Cardiacs made another attempt to recapture their momentum and play to fresh audiences by supporting long-terms fans the Wildhearts for the latter's tour between 8–15 December 2004. This tour saw another substitution – drummer Stephen Gilchrist (Graham Coxon, the Scaramanga Six, Stuffy/The Fuses) stood in for Bob Leith, who had previous tour commitments with art-punk band Blurt. Smith would later perform as a live acoustic trio with Ginger Wildheart and former Cardiac Jon Poole. Around this time a "Diary" was begun and updated for the majority of 2005 on the official Cardiacs website, chronicling the band's exploits in typical absurd fashion. Three more annual Astoria gigs passed (the 2005 edition having been professionally shot, currently existing in an unedited state awaiting Tim Smith's involvement until 2007 when Cardiacs released their first new material for eight years: the "Ditzy Scene" single. Released on Org Records as a limited edition of 1,000 copies, "Ditzy Scene" was also the first release by the new lineup: on record this included Claire, Melanie, Cathy and Dawn, but the 2007 winter tour featured only Melanie and Cathy, both of whom were now playing percussion and singing.

2008–2020: Indefinite hiatus and death of Tim Smith

Tim Smith's heart attack 

At the end of June 2008, Tim Smith collapsed from a cardiac arrest after leaving a My Bloody Valentine concert. This led to hypoxic brain damage, leaving Smith severely debilitated by the rare condition dystonia. All Cardiacs-related releases and activity (including a work-in-progress album, provisionally entitled LSD) were immediately shelved until further notice. A year of silence followed during which Smith recuperated in private. In June 2009, a new announcement appeared on the official Cardiacs website, letting readers know that, after a year of rehabilitation, Tim Smith's mind had returned to full functionality and that "no part of your favourite pop star's intellect or personality has been found to be absent whatsoever." It thanked fans for their kind thoughts and made clear Smith's interest in returning to playing music with Cardiacs at such time as his physical rehabilitation allowed. However, it became clear that such rehabilitation would be a long process; and in August 2010, Kavus Torabi stated in an interview podcast that Cardiacs would never play live again.

Hiatus, fundraisers and related activities 
Despite the enforced halt in Cardiacs' work as an active band, the group's influence and presence has been sustained by various concerts and campaigns. While most of these have been primarily aimed at raising money for Tim Smith's medical rehabilitation, they have also served both to raise awareness of the band's work and the growing body of musicians influenced by it.

In December 2010, two tribute CDs, Leader of the Starry Skies: A Tribute To Tim Smith, Songbook 1 and its limited edition companion Leader of the Starry Skies - A Loyal Companion, were compiled by former Cardiac Christian Hayes and former Spratleys Japs singer Jo Spratley. These were released on Kavus Torabi's record label Believers Roast, with all proceeds going directly to the continuing care of Tim Smith. The albums featured cover versions of Smith-penned material (originally for Cardiacs, the Sea Nymphs, Spratleys Japs and Smith's solo album OceanLandWorld) by musicians including the Magic Numbers, Steven Wilson, Oceansize, Robert White/Andy Partridge, Sidi Bou Said and North Sea Radio Orchestra as well as former Cardiacs including Hayes himself (as Mikrokosmos), Torabi (as Knifeworld), William D. Drake, Mark Cawthra and Peter Tagg (with the Trudy).

In 2013, after a long period of radio silence, the official Cardiacs website relaunched with many pieces of merchandise for sale. Among other updates, an amendment to the 'History' section of the site humorously addressed Tim Smith's accident, subsequent incapacitation and the band's hiatus.

In the coming years, various Cardiacs releases would and continue to be added to the online shop, most notably a 2015 Seaside boxset containing the original album remastered and with the original four "missing" tracks restored, as well as various supplementary material related to the era.

In 2013 and 2015 events dubbed "The Alphabet Business Convention" were held in celebration of and with all proceeds going towards Tim Smith's rehabilitation. They featured Cardiacs-related groups in performance such as Knifeworld, William D. Drake, and Redbus Noface. Several smaller benefit concerts were held from time to time in this period and moving forward.

In a 2016 feature via The Quietus, Kavus Torabi shed light on several past, present, and future Cardiacs projects.  It was an extraordinarily interesting and brilliant time for me because we'd already talked a great deal about what the plan was for the next few years for Cardiacs. We were going to make a film. Tim and I were planning out loads of treatments and scripts. Tim wanted to share the burden of Cardiacs a bit with someone and I was more than happy to do that. The way things stand, [LSD] is nearly done but needs vocals and eyebrows and some of them need a few other touches. What there is does sound great but there's far more stuff completed that hasn't come out yet, that needs to come out. Tim is a perfectionist, and rightly so. Because his melodies make so much sense of everything, it would be ridiculous to put out these recordings, as exciting as they are, without the melodies. We have talked about people who Tim would approve of adding vocals, under his direction. I think Tim just wants to be well enough to really be producing it. I think his big drive at the moment is to finish off things that were started. There are a lot of loose ends that need tying up. 

Later the same year, teaser images began appearing on Cardiacs' website and Facebook group, culminating in the announcement of the long-awaited next Sea Nymphs album, On the Dry Land, whose songs had been recorded around the same time as the first album but were left unreleased for over 20 years. The album was released in November 2016 in CD and vinyl formats. The completion of on the Dry Land was made possible thanks to a turn for the better in Tim Smith's health; he was able to return to the studio to supervise production and additional recording necessary to the album's completion between 2015-2016. In an interview with Uncut, Smith revealed that even more Sea Nymphs material beyond on the Dry Land will be released at some point. He also stated that he was "deeply touched" by the efforts of those who had contributed toward the Cardiacs tribute album, Leader of the Starry Skies (the sales of which went directly toward rehabilitating Smith) and that he had since "made a pledge to [him]self to get better".

In November 2016, Jo Spratley gathered several musicians of Cardiacs-influenced origins and "reformed" her and Tim Smith's band, Spratleys Japs (albeit without Smith due to his health, although he did attend as an audience member), for a one night show in which the band performed the entirety of the Japs' sole album, Pony (1999), as well as the remaining tracks from the "Hazel" EP (and ended the set with Cardiacs' own "Flap Off You Beak"). A second show was announced shortly afterward for January 2017, as a double billing with Kavus Torabi's band Guapo.

In December 2016 Tim, Sarah, and William D. Drake were interviewed for Prog magazine, detailing more of Tim's current condition, the sessions behind On the Dry Land's creation and completion and confirming "at least an album's worth" of Sea Nymphs material that is yet to be finished. Cardiacs will always be here. As for me, I'm still fighting them critters who are trying their best to stop me. But they are losing. 
-Tim Smith

A third Alphabet Business Convention was held on 26 August 2017, featuring Cardiacs-related and inspired bands, in the spirit of the preceding conventions. The following month, in September 2017, the Alphabet Business Concern released the long-awaited Some Fairytales from the Rotten Shed DVD which featured Cardiacs rehearsing early songs (mixed with surrealist comedy similar to the Maresnest DVD) in preparation for "The Special Garage Concerts"-era live shows. (Prior to this, only four clips had been available to the public via the "abcglobus" YouTube channel, with a nearly-complete version of the DVD having been screened at the 2013 Alphabet Business Convention. During this time, the unreleased film was commonly referred to as "The Bumming Shed video" or "The Garage Rehearsals video".)

In January 2018, almost ten years since Tim Smith's cardiac arrest, an interview and full explanation of his condition were published in multiple major news publications as well as the official Cardiacs website. A donation campaign was simultaneously launched, its goal being to facilitate improved care for Smith with the hope that the proper neurological treatment it would fund would help him regain control of his body, as he had responded positively to similar, but minimal and inconsistent treatment in the past. The initial donation goal of 40,000 GBP was breached in less than 24 hours, and a new goal of 100,000 GBP was instated, which would fund treatment for one year.

In March 2018, almost all of the Cardiacs back catalogue (including all of the post-1990 singles and EPs, plus the OceanLandWorld, Spratleys Japs, Sea Nymphs and Mr & Mrs Smith & Mr Drake spinoff projects) was reissued on Bandcamp as digital downloads.

Death of Tim Smith 
Following twelve years of living with dystonia, Smith died on 21 July 2020, with his death announced the following day. Following his death, Smith received a raft of tributes on social media.

Musical and lyrical style 
Cardiacs' music is noted for balancing the attack and 'raw energy' of punk rock with the intricacies and technical cleverness of early British progressive rock. The band also incorporates elements of other musical forms such as ska, mediaeval music, folk music, heavy metal, hymns and corporate anthems. The music magazine Organ once commented that "one Cardiacs song contains more ideas than most other musicians' entire careers."

The broad combination of styles in the band's music has sometimes been referred to as "progressive punk" – or "pronk" – and has led to Cardiacs being labelled the primary exponents of this musical style. Tim Smith rejected the term, preferring the description "psychedelic" or simply "pop". Musicians that the band have cited as influences include XTC, Van der Graaf Generator, Gong, early Split Enz, Devo, Gentle Giant, Alberto y Lost Trios Paranoias, early Genesis, Deaf School and Wire. The Who's Quadrophenia was particularly influential on Smith's approach to songwriting, having taught how to write musical notation from the album's songbook. Smith once stated, "I don't know what influences us really, I wouldn't say that we are influenced by any actual bands in particular". Tim Smith denied that Gentle Giant was an influence on the band, but Sarah Smith says that they were.Earlier lineups of the band were sextets and octets employing extensive use of saxophones, percussion and live keyboards. From 1991 onwards, the band was a rock power quartet centred on two guitars (with the remaining keyboard and percussion parts sequenced on tape). Vocally, Cardiacs employed a distinctive singing style centred on Tim Smith's lead vocals (reedy and high-pitched, with a strong, punk-styled south London suburban accent) and choral sections (varying from yelled to falsetto) involving most or all of the band. Smith's singing style has been described by music critics as 'skittish'; it has also been commented that his singing voice sounded very similar to his speaking one. The band's music was written almost entirely by Tim Smith, although contributions were sometimes made by other group members.

Smith was also responsible for the majority of the band's lyrics, which were written in a cryptic fractured form of English alternately hailed as poetic or nonsensical. He generally refused to discuss their content, preferring to keep the words and their inspirations shrouded in mystique and allowing for fan interpretations. Smith also sometimes employed a cut-up lyrical approach drawing on the works of (among others), William Blake, Charles Kingsley, William Shakespeare and T.S. Eliot. Two favourite cut-and-paste sources were Pedro Carolino's English As She Is Spoke (a failed Victorian English-Portuguese phrasebook once hailed by Mark Twain as a perfect example of absurdity) and the nineteenth-century Irish poet George Darley. Fans have also spotted references to the films The Night of the Hunter and Eraserhead in Smith's words and music videos.

Performance style and mythology 

Alphabet's original representative characters were Cardiac's "sordid, waxy" manager "the Consultant" (real name James Stevens) and his assistant and band advisor "Miss Swift", both of whom made onstage appearances with Cardiacs during the 1980s.

In performance, Cardiacs generally rejected (or occasionally parodied) standard rock band posturing. The band's shows instead featured behaviour which has been described as "therapeutic, surrealist pantomime", compared to absurdist theatre, and labelled "not so much theatrically eccentric as completely fucking neurotic". During any given performance Tim Smith ranted between and during numbers, acting out bizarre childlike ideas and emotions. During the 1980s the band perfected a detailed stage act involving shabby lift attendant costumes, badly-applied clown makeup, Tim Smith's bullying and confrontation of other band members (predominantly Jim Smith), and a final formal presentation of champagne and flowers by the Consultant and Miss Swift complete with confetti, taking place to "a euphoric sweep of saxophone and keyboards that wouldn't seem out of place in a '70s cigar advert." During the 1990s, the theatrical elements of the live show were toned down and the uniforms replaced by formal suits, although certain rituals (including the childlike mannerisms and Smith's ranting style) were retained.

Legacy 
While the critical status of Cardiacs is wildly mixed (the band tends to attract extreme responses with some critics hailing them while others violently condemn them to the point of pariahhood), Cardiacs were renowned for their unique performing and songwriting styles and their poetically cryptic, philosophical and abstract lyrics, as well as for their ability to produce a unique, complex and innovative sound with all their musical ventures over and over again throughout their long career. Tim Smith regularly attracted fulsome praise: he has been described in the music press as the "Mozart", "Beethoven" and "Messiaen" of rock and pop music for his complex and innovative compositional skills, as well as being hailed as a genius (albeit sometimes a "deranged" one). The snooker player Steve Davis is also a big fan of the band and attended many of their live gigs.

Cardiacs have had a profound underground influence on over three decades of musicians, including the pioneers of the nu metal and avant-garde metal genres. The band has also influenced math rock artists such as the Monsoon Bassoon and Battles. The band are sometimes credited as having been the inventors of the "pronk" (progressive punk) music genre; Tim Smith rejected the term from the off, stating that Cardiacs are better described as a pop group or a psychedelic rock band.

Groups who have cited Tim Smith's work as a major influence include Blur and Radiohead, as well as Mike Vennart of Oceansize, Mike Patton of Faith No More and Mr. Bungle, and Tool. During the 1980s, Cardiacs were a professed influence or inspiration for Marillion, It Bites and British psychedelic acts such as Ring; during the 1990s, emerging bands and musicians who were Cardiacs fans included Blur, Supergrass, Shane Embury of Napalm Death, Storm Corrosion's Steven Wilson and Mikael Åkerfeldt, Neil Cicierega, the Scaramanga Six, the Monsoon Bassoon, Leech Woman, Justin Hawkins of The Darkness and the Wildhearts (who would later pay direct tribute via their track "Tim Smith" on 2009's Chutzpah!). In recent years, Cardiacs has been an influence on a new generation of underground bands such as Rocketgoldstar, Little Trophy, the Display Team, Liberty Ships, Major Parkinson and Silvery.

Six months after Tim Smith's death, Cardiacs' discography was added to streaming services on 22 January 2021.

Members 

Current members
 Jim Smith – bass, vocals (1977–present)
 Bob Leith – drums (1994–present)
 Kavus Torabi – guitar, vocals (2003–present)
 Cathy Harabaras – percussion (2004–present)
 Melanie Woods – vocals (2004–present)

Former members

 Tim Smith – lead vocals, guitar, keyboards (1977–2020; died 2020)
 Michael Pugh – lead vocals (1977–1980)
 Peter Tagg – drums (1977–1979)
 Colvin Mayers – keyboards (1978–1981; died 1993)
 Ralf Cade  – saxophone (1978–1979)
 Mark Cawthra – drums (1979–1982), keyboards, vocals (1982–1983)
 Sarah Smith – saxophone, vocals, keyboards (1980–1989; touring 1989–2007)
 Tim Quy – percussion, keyboards (1981–1990; died 2023)
 Dominic Luckman – drums (1982–1993)
 William D. Drake – keyboards, vocals (1983–1990)
 Graham Simmonds – guitar (1983–1984)
 Margurite Jonston  – saxophone (1983–1984)
 The Consultant – manager, label representative (1984–1989)
 Miss Swift – label representative (1984–1989)
 Christian Hayes – guitar, vocals (1989–1991)
 Jon Poole – guitar, keyboards, vocals (1991–2003)
 Sharron Fortnam – vocals (2004–2008)
 Claire Lemmon – vocals (2004–2008)
 Dawn Staple – percussion (2004–2008)
 Mr Hiles – Ordinary Shop Girl

Discography 

 A Little Man and a House and the Whole World Window (1988)
 On Land and in the Sea (1989)
 Heaven Born and Ever Bright (1992)
 Sing to God (1996)
 Guns (1999)
 LSD (2008; cancelled)

Notes

References

External links 

 
 Pete's Cardiacs site contains a wealth of information from 1976–present
 Cardiacs Museum
 Cardiacs fan site by Mandi Apple with photos and scans
 2016 interview with The Sea Nymphs, featuring Tim Smith's first interview since his stroke
 Tim Smith Health Statement 2018
 Weʼre raising £100,000 to fund Tim Smith's healthcare costs for one year
 
 

 
Musical groups established in 1981
Post-punk music groups
Musical groups from the Royal Borough of Kingston upon Thames